Sir Gaven John Donne  (8 May 1914 – 28 March 2010) was a New Zealand-born former Chief Justice of Samoa, Niue, the Cook Islands, Nauru and Tuvalu.

Biography
Donne was born in Christchurch and educated at Palmerston North Boys' High School, Hastings Boys' High School, Victoria University College and Auckland University College. He was admitted to the bar in 1938, and became a magistrate in 1958.

Donne had a long legal career in the Pacific.  In 1969 he was seconded to the Supreme Court of Samoa, and in 1972 he was appointed Chief Justice.  In 1975 he was appointed Chief Justice of the Cook Islands and Niue. In 1978, he presided over the electoral petitions resulting from the 1978 Cook Islands election, which saw the Cook Islands Party of Albert Henry removed from power for electoral fraud.

In 1982 he was appointed as the first Queen's Representative to the Cook Islands.  After completing his term, he became Chief Justice of Nauru and Tuvalu in 1985.

Donne retired from the bench in 2001 making him one of the longest serving judges in the Southern Hemisphere.

Honours and awards
In 1977, Donne was awarded the Queen Elizabeth II Silver Jubilee Medal. In the 1979 New Year Honours, he was appointed a Knight Commander of the Order of the British Empire.

References

1914 births
2010 deaths
Queen's Representatives in the Cook Islands
Chief justices of the Cook Islands
Chief justices of Nauru
Chief justices of Niue
Chief justices of Samoa
Chief justices of Tuvalu
New Zealand judges on the courts of the Cook Islands
New Zealand judges on the courts of Niue
New Zealand judges on the courts of Samoa
New Zealand judges on the courts of Nauru
New Zealand judges on the courts of Tuvalu
University of Auckland alumni
Victoria University of Wellington alumni
New Zealand military personnel of World War II
New Zealand Knights Commander of the Order of the British Empire